Raphael Tessaro Schettino (born September 22, 1985 in Castelo), or simply Raphael, is a Brazilian goalkeeper. He currently plays for Botafogo.

Contract 

10 October 2005 to 9 October 2010

External links 
 CBF
 tradutorweb.br
 

1985 births
Living people
Brazilian footballers
Botafogo de Futebol e Regatas players
Association football goalkeepers